Attention deficit hyperactivity disorder predominantly inattentive (ADHD-PI or ADHD-I), is one of the three presentations of attention deficit hyperactivity disorder (ADHD). In 1987–1994, there were no subtypes and thus it was not distinguished from hyperactive ADHD in the Diagnostic and Statistical Manual (DSM-III-R).

The 'predominantly inattentive subtype' is similar to the other presentations of ADHD except that it is characterized primarily by problems with inattention or a deficit of sustained attention, such as procrastination, hesitation, and forgetfulness. It differs in having fewer or no typical symptoms of hyperactivity or impulsiveness. Lethargy and fatigue are sometimes reported, but ADHD-PI is a separate condition from the proposed cluster of symptoms known as sluggish cognitive tempo (SCT).

Classification 
ADHD-PI is an attention-concentration deficit that has everything in common with other forms of ADHD except that it has fewer hyperactivity or impulsivity symptoms and has more directed attention fatigue symptoms.

Signs and symptoms

DSM-5 criteria
The DSM-5 allows for diagnosis of the predominantly inattentive presentations of ADHD (ICD-10 code F90.0) if the individual presents six or more (five for adults) of the following symptoms of inattention for at least six months to a point that is disruptive and inappropriate for developmental level:
 Often does not give close attention to details or makes careless mistakes in schoolwork, work, or other activities.
 Often has trouble keeping attention on tasks or play activities.
 Often does not seem to listen when spoken to directly.
 Often does not follow instructions and fails to finish schoolwork, chores, or duties in the workplace (not due to oppositional behavior or failure to understand instructions).
 Often has trouble organizing activities.
 Often avoids, dislikes, or doesn't want to do things that take a lot of mental effort for a long period (such as schoolwork or homework).
 Often loses things needed for tasks and activities (e.g. toys, school assignments, pencils, books, or tools).
 Is often easily distracted.
 Is often forgetful in daily activities.

An ADHD diagnosis is contingent upon the symptoms of impairment presenting themselves in two or more settings (e.g., at school or work and at home). There must also be clear evidence of clinically significant impairment in social, academic, or occupational functioning. Lastly, the symptoms must not occur exclusively during the course of schizophrenia or another psychotic disorder, and are not better accounted for by another mental disorder (e.g., mood disorder, anxiety disorder, dissociative disorder, personality disorder).

Treatment

Although ADHD has most often been treated with medication, medications do not cure ADHD. They are used solely to treat the symptoms associated with this disorder and the symptoms will come back once the medication stops.

Medication

Stimulants are typically formulated in fast and slow-acting as well as short and long-acting formulations. The fast-acting amphetamine mixed salts (Adderall) and its derivatives, with short and long-acting formulations bind to the trace amine associated receptor and triggers the release of dopamine into the synaptic cleft. They may have a better cardiovascular disease profile than methylphenidate and potentially better tolerated.

The fast-acting methylphenidate (well known under the trade name Ritalin) is a dopamine reuptake inhibitor. In the short term, methylphenidate is well tolerated. However, long-term studies have not been conducted in adults, and concerns about long-term effects like increases in blood pressure have not been established.

The slow and long-acting nonstimulant atomoxetine (Strattera), is primarily a norepinephrine reuptake inhibitor and, to a lesser extent, a dopamine reuptake inhibitor. It may be more effective for those with predominantly inattentive concentration. It is sometimes prescribed in adults who do not get enough vigilant concentration response from mixed amphetamine salts (Adderall) or get too many side effects. It is also approved for ADHD by the US Food and Drug Administration.

The use of cholinergic adjunctive medications is uncommon and their clinical effects are poorly researched; consequently, cholinergics such as galantamine or varenicline would be off label use for ADHD. New nicotinic cholinergic medications in development for ADHD are pozanicline, ABT-418, and ABT-894.

Prognosis

Self-esteem
In some cases, children who enjoy learning may develop a sense of fear when faced with structured or planned work, especially long or group-based assignments that require extended focus, even if they thoroughly understand the topic. Children with ADHD-PI may be at greater risk of academic failures and early withdrawal from school.  Teachers and parents may make incorrect assumptions about the behaviors and attitudes of a child with ADHD-PI, and may provide them with frequent and erroneous negative feedback (e.g. "careless", "you're irresponsible", "you're immature", "you're lazy", "you don't care/show any effort", "you just aren't trying", etc.).

The inattentive children may realize on some level that they are somehow different internally from their peers. However, they are also likely to accept and internalize the continuous negative feedback, creating a negative self-image that becomes self-reinforcing.  If these children progress into adulthood undiagnosed or untreated, their inattentiveness, ongoing frustrations, and poor self-image frequently create numerous and severe problems maintaining healthy relationships, succeeding in postsecondary schooling, or succeeding in the workplace.  These problems can compound frustrations and low self-esteem, and will often lead to the development of secondary pathologies including anxiety disorders, mood disorders, and substance abuse.

Coping and age
It has been suggested that some of the symptoms of ADHD present in childhood appear to be less overt in adulthood.  This is likely due to an adult's ability to make cognitive adjustments and develop compensating or coping skills to minimize the impact of inattentive or hyperactive symptoms. However, the core problems of ADHD do not disappear with age. Some researchers have suggested that individuals with reduced or less overt hyperactivity symptoms should receive the ADHD-combined diagnosis. Hallowell and Ratey (2005) suggest that the manifestation of hyperactivity simply changes with adolescence and adulthood, becoming a more generalized restlessness or tendency to fidget.

Comparisons between subtypes
A meta-analysis of 37 studies on cognitive differences between those presenting ADHD-Predominantly Inattentive presentations and ADHD-Combined type found that "the ADHD-C presenting performed better than the ADHD-PI presenting in the areas of processing speed, attention, performance IQ, memory, and fluency. The ADHD-PI presenting performed better than the ADHD-C group on measures of flexibility, working memory, visual/spatial ability, non-verbal IQ, motor ability, and language. Both the ADHD-C and ADHD-PI groups were found to perform more poorly than the control group on measures of inhibition, however, there was no difference found between the two groups. Furthermore, the ADHD-C and ADHD-PI presenting did not differ on measures of sustained attention."

Epidemiology 

It is difficult to say exactly how many children or adults worldwide have ADHD because different countries have used different ways of diagnosing it, while some do not diagnose it at all. In the UK, diagnosis is based on quite a narrow set of symptoms, and about 0.5–1% of children are thought to have attention or hyperactivity problems. In comparison, professionals in the U.S. used a much broader definition of the term ADHD until recently. This meant up to 10% of children in the U.S. were described as having ADHD. Current estimates suggest that ADHD is present internationally in about 7.2% of children. About five times more boys than girls are diagnosed with ADHD. Boys are seen as the prototypical ADHD child, therefore they are more often diagnosed with ADHD than girls. This may be partly because of the particular ways they express their difficulties. Boys and girls both have attention problems, but due to differences in gender and symptoms, boys may come off as more active in their symptoms and therefore may seem harder to manage. Children from all cultures and social groups are diagnosed with ADHD. However, children from certain backgrounds may be particularly likely to be diagnosed with ADHD, because of different expectations about how they should behave. It is, therefore, important to ensure that a child's cultural background is understood and taken into account as part of the assessment.

History

In 1980, the DSM-III changed the name of the condition from "hyperkinetic reaction of childhood" to "attention deficit disorder" (ADD). That happened because research by Virginia Douglas had suggested that the attention deficits were more important than the hyperactive behavior for understanding the disorder. The new label also reflected the observation of clinicians that attention deficits could also exist without hyperactivity.

For the first time, two subtypes were introduced: ADD with hyperactivity (ADD+H) and ADD without hyperactivity (ADD-H). While the ADD+H category was fairly consistent with previous definitions, the latter subtype represented essentially a new category. Thus, almost everything that is known about the predominantly inattentive subtype is based on research conducted since 1980.

References

Attention deficit hyperactivity disorder
Amphetamine